Arevik is a town in Armenia.

Arevik may also refer to:

 Arevik National Park, Armenia
 Arevik, Shirak, Armenia, a village and rural community
 Arev Petrosyan (born 1972), Armenian painter
 Arevik Petrosyan (born 1972), Armenian politician, lawyer and judge
 Arevik Tserunyan (born 1987), Armenian painter

Armenian feminine given names